Daniel John Caruso Jr. (born January 17, 1965) is an American film director, producer, and screenwriter. His work encompasses a variety of genres, including thriller (Disturbia, Taking Lives), drama (Standing Up), horror (The Disappointments Room), and action (I Am Number Four, XXX: Return of Xander Cage). He has also directed numerous episodes of television series such as The Shield, Over There, Smallville, and Dark Angel. The majority of his films fall into the thriller and action film genres.

Early life and education
Caruso was born in Norwalk, Connecticut, the son of Lorraine (Zullo) and Daniel John Caruso, who owned a salon, House of Beauty. He is of Italian descent. He graduated from Norwalk High School in 1983. He is a graduate of Pepperdine University in Malibu, California.

Career
Caruso began his career as a protege of director John Badham, acting as producer and second unit director on films like Point of No Return, Drop Zone, and Nick of Time. He directed multiple episodes of television series like High Incident and Beyond Belief: Fact or Fiction, in addition to two made-for-television films.

His feature film directorial debut was The Salton Sea, a stylish 2002 crime thriller starring Val Kilmer and Vincent D'Onofrio that has since gained minor cult status. Caruso next directed the Angelina Jolie and Ethan Hawke-starring psychological thriller film Taking Lives. The film was released in theaters on March 19, 2004, but did not meet box office expectations, grossing $65,470,529 from a $35 million budget. However, the film proved to be a success on home video, holding its place as the number one best-selling DVD for three straight weeks. Two for the Money was Caruso's next film which was considered "a well done sport thriller, but with too many details". The film was released on October 7, 2005, and was a moderate success, grossing $30,526,509 worldwide with a modest budget of $18 million. It was later released on DVD on January 17, 2006.

In 2007, Caruso was asked by Steven Spielberg to direct Disturbia. The movie was Caruso's first big hit, grossing over $117 million on a $20 million budget. It starred Shia LaBeouf, Sarah Roemer, David Morse, Aaron Yoo, and Carrie-Anne Moss. It was released April 13, 2007 in theaters and on DVD August 7. Eagle Eye was Caruso's second collaboration with producer Spielberg and actor LaBeouf. It also starred Michelle Monaghan, Billy Bob Thornton, Rosario Dawson and was released in theaters September 26, 2008. Critical reactions were mixed to negative but, on its opening weekend the movie grossed $29.1 million in 3,510 theaters in the United States and Canada. As of 2017, it has grossed $201 million worldwide with a movie budget of $80 million.

He directed the YA novel adaptation I Am Number Four in 2011, which film grossed $161 million worldwide, but failed to build enough interest for an intended sequel. Two years later, he fulfilled a long-time passion project with the coming-of-age film Standing Up, the director's first family film. It is based on Brock Cole's novel, The Goats. The film stars Chandler Canterbury and Annalise Basso as two geeky children who embark on a journey of discovery and self-discovery after they are stripped naked and left stranded together on an island as part of a summer camp prank. Caruso began adapting the novel in the early nineties with then-partner Ken Aguado, who produced the film. Standing Up was produced for a small budget of $3 million and was released on August 16, 2013.

In August 2013, Caruso planned to direct the film adaptation of the comic Preacher. Caruso was also working on a film titled Selling Time, a supernatural thriller potentially starring Will Smith, about a man who is given the unique opportunity to relive the worst day of his life, in exchange for seven years off his own life expectancy. Both projects have since fallen through, with the former property being adapted into a hit television series aired on AMC.

He was a guest judge on the Fox reality television show On the Lot for the episode of May 28 and 29 in 2007. Caruso directed his first music video in 2007 for the song "Don't Make Me Wait" by This World Fair. In 2009, he directed the music video for Airborne Toxic Event's song "Sometime Around Midnight".

On April 2, 2015, Caruso was hired to direct the as-of-yet untitled third entry in the G.I. Joe film series, with Aaron Berg writing the screenplay. October 2015, actor and producer Vin Diesel had Caruso sign on as the director of XXX: Return of Xander Cage. The film was debuted as the number one film in the world and made $347 million worldwide.

Caruso directed the film Redeeming Love based on Francine Rivers' 1991 novel of the same name after "he fell in love with the characters and the story when his wife introduced him to the novel." The film was set for a spring 2021 release, but was rescheduled to early 2022.

Personal life
Caruso married actress Holly Kuespert on July 6, 1990. They have five children: Brandon, Daniel, Sophia, Charlie and Sally.

Filmography

Film

Producer

Television

Executive producer
 Rebound: The Legend of Earl "The Goat" Manigault (1996) (TV movie)

References

External links

Q&A with D. J. Caruso
 D. J. Caruso Interview 

1965 births
Living people
21st-century American male writers
21st-century American screenwriters
Action film directors
American people of Italian descent
American male screenwriters
American television directors
Film directors from Connecticut
Film producers from Connecticut
Horror film directors
Norwalk High School (Connecticut) alumni
Pepperdine University alumni
Screenwriters from Connecticut
Writers from Norwalk, Connecticut